Zstandard, commonly known by the name of its reference implementation zstd, is a lossless data compression algorithm developed by Yann Collet at Facebook.
Zstd is the reference implementation in C. Version 1 of this implementation was released as open-source software on 31 August 2016.

Features
Zstandard was designed to give a compression ratio comparable to that of the DEFLATE algorithm (developed in 1991 and used in the original ZIP and gzip programs), but faster, especially for decompression. It is tunable with compression levels ranging from negative 7 (fastest) to 22 (slowest in compression speed, but best compression ratio).

Starting from version 1.3.2 (October 2017), zstd optionally implements very long range search and deduplication (128 MiB window) similar to rzip or lrzip.

Compression speed can vary by a factor of 20 or more between the fastest and slowest levels, while decompression is uniformly fast, varying by less than 20% between the fastest and slowest levels. Zstandard command-line has an "adaptive" mode that varies compression level depending on I/O conditions, mainly how fast it can write the output.

Zstd at its maximum compression level gives a compression ratio close to lzma,
lzham, and ppmx, and  Zstandard reaches the current Pareto frontier, as it decompresses faster than any other currently available algorithm with similar or better compression ratio.

Dictionaries can have a large impact on the compression ratio of small files, so Zstandard can use a user-provided compression dictionary. It also offers a training mode, able to generate a dictionary from a set of samples. In particular, one dictionary can be loaded to process large sets of files with redundancy between files, but not necessarily within each file, e.g., log files.

Design

Zstandard combines a dictionary-matching stage (LZ77) with a large search window and a fast entropy-coding stage. It uses both Huffman coding (used for entries in the Literals section) and finite-state entropy (FSE) - a fast tabled version of ANS, tANS, used for entries in the Sequences section. Because of the way that FSE carries over state between symbols, decompression involves processing symbols within the Sequences section of each block in reverse order (from last to first).

Usage

The Linux kernel has included Zstandard since November 2017 (version 4.14) as a compression method for the btrfs and squashfs filesystems.

In 2017, Allan Jude integrated Zstandard into the FreeBSD kernel, and it was subsequently integrated as a compressor option for core dumps (both user programs and kernel panics). It was also used to create a proof-of-concept OpenZFS compression method which was integrated in 2020.

The AWS Redshift and RocksDB databases include support for field compression using Zstandard.

In March 2018, Canonical tested the use of zstd as a deb package compression method by default for the Ubuntu Linux distribution. Compared with xz compression of deb packages, zstd at level 19 decompresses significantly faster, but at the cost of 6% larger package files. Support was added to Debian (and subsequently, Ubuntu) in April 2018 (in version 1.6~rc1).

Arch Linux added support for zstd as a package compression method in October 2019 with the release of the pacman 5.2 package manager and in January 2020 switched from xz to zstd for the packages in the official repository. Arch uses zstd -c -T0 --ultra -20 -, the size of all compressed packages combined increased by 0.8% (compared to xz), the decompression speed is 14 times faster, decompression memory increased by 50 MiB when using multiple threads, compression memory increases but scales with the number of threads used. Arch Linux later also switched to zstd as default compression algorithm for mkinitcpio initial ramdisk generator.

Fedora added ZStandard support to RPM in May 2018 (Fedora release 28) and used it for packaging the release in October 2019 (Fedora 31). In Fedora 33, the filesystem is compressed by default with zstd.

Full implementation of the algorithm with an option to choose the compression level is used in the .NSZ/.XCZ file formats developed by the homebrew community for the Nintendo Switch hybrid game console. Similarly, it is also one of many supported compression algorithms in the .RVZ Nintendo Wii and Nintendo GameCube disc image file format.

In 2020, Zstandard was implemented in version 6.3.8 of the zip file format with codec number 93. Previous number 20 of version 6.3.7 was deprecated, so a second file format with zip is available for Zstandard files. New versions of zip programs often support this new feature.

7-Zip ZS, a fork of 7-Zip FM with Zstandard (and other formats) support, is developed by Tino Reichardt. Actual Zstandard 1.5.0 support is here.

Modern7z, a Zstandard (and other formats) plugin for 7-Zip FM is developed by Denis Anisimov (TC4shell).

p7zip also supports in a new version Zstandard 1.4.9.

License
The reference implementation is licensed under the BSD license, published at GitHub. Since version 1.0, it had an additional Grant of Patent Rights.

From version 1.3.1, this patent grant was dropped and the license was changed to a BSD + GPLv2 dual license.

See also
 Zlib
 LZFSE – a similar algorithm by Apple used since iOS 9 and OS X 10.11 made open source on 1 June 2016
 LZ4 (compression algorithm) – a fast member of the LZ77 family

References

External links
 
 
 
 "Smaller and faster data compression with Zstandard", Yann Collet and Chip Turner, 31 August 2016, Facebook Announcement
 The Guardian is using ZStandard instead of zlib

2016 software
C (programming language) libraries
Free data compression software
Lossless compression algorithms
Software using the BSD license